Dobrogensisnenteria is a genus of mites in the family Nenteriidae.

Species
 Dobrogensisnenteria banatica (Feider & Hutu, 1971)     
 Dobrogensisnenteria dobrogensis (Feider & Hutu, 1971)     
 Dobrogensisnenteria norimbergensis (Hirschmann & Zirngiebl-Nicol, 1969)     
 Dobrogensisnenteria oudemansi (Hirschmann & Zirngiebl-Nicol, 1969)     
 Dobrogensisnenteria oudemansiformis (Hirschmann, 1985)     
 Dobrogensisnenteria postneri (Hirschmann & Zirngiebl-Nicol, 1969)

References

Mesostigmata
Arachnid genera